Calonotos is a genus of moths in the subfamily Arctiinae. The genus was erected by Jacob Hübner in 1819.

Species
Calonotos acutipennis (Zerny, 1931) Brazil (Para)
Calonotos aequimaculatus (Zerny, 1931) Brazil (Para)
Calonotos angustipennis (Zerny, 1931) Brazil (Para)
Calonotos antennata Rothschild, 1911 Venezuela
Calonotos aurata (Walker, 1854) Venezuela
Calonotos chalcipleura Hampson, 1898 Venezuela, Brazil (Para)
Calonotos chlorota (Dognin, 1914) Colombia
Calonotos craneae Fleming, 1957 Trinidad
Calonotos dorata (Dognin, 1897) Colombia, Bolivia, Ecuador
Calonotos helymus (Cramer, [1775]) Suriname
Calonotos hoffmannsi Rothschild, 1911 Brazil (Amazonas)
Calonotos longipennis Rothschild, 1911 Suriname
Calonotos metallicus Druce, 1886 Panama, Costa Rica
Calonotos niger (Gaede, 1926) Brazil (Amazonas)
Calonotos opalizans Rothschild, 1911 Venezuela
Calonotos phlegmon (Cramer, [1775]) Suriname, Amazons (Amazonas, Para)
Calonotos plumulatus Klages, 1906 Venezuela
Calonotos rectifascia Talbot, 1932 Colombia
Calonotos tiburtus (Cramer, [1779]) Costa Rica, Panama, Guiana, Suriname
Calonotos triplaga Hampson, 1909 French Guiana, Brazil (Amazonas, Para)
Calonotos tripunctata Druce, 1898 St. Vincent, Trinidad, Amazon

References

External links

Arctiinae